Rhizomucor pusillus is a species of Rhizomucor. It can cause disease in humans.
R. pusillus is a grey mycelium fungi most commonly found in compost piles. Yellow-brown spores grow on a stalk to reproduce more fungal cells.

Biology 
Rhizomucor pusillus is a thermophilic fungus that lives in hot environments. Its growth optimum is between 50 and 70 degrees Celsius. It is a good producer of amylase. It is homothallic and can cause infections in humans and animals. R. pusillus cells have stolons, rhizoids, and branched sporangiophores. Because of the high temperatures required for this microorganism, it is difficult to study in laboratory environments. The ability to utilize different carbon sources can be used differentiate this fungus from other species: it is unable to assimilate sucrose, glycine, phenylalanine, and B-alanine.

Diversity 
There are three species in the genus Rhizomucor. R. pusillus, R. miehei, and R.hizomucor variabilis. R. pusillus is the only species of genus that is thermophilic. R. variabilis and R. miehei are homogenous and homothallic. Colors of the sporangia and size and shape of diameter vary between the three species. The degree of intraspecies variability is high. R. pusillus lives in geothermal places that create and produce their own heat, such as piles of compost and garbage or landfills. Thermophiles reproduce both sexually and asexually. Most common reproduction is asexually, through mitosis. Thermophiles reproduce asexually, when a male spore and a female spore come in contact with each other. Different strains of R. pusillus segregate into two subclusters at very high levels causing different EST and G6D patterns.

Roles in disease 
Rhizomucor pusillis can lead to zygomycosis in humans. It causes necrosis of infected tissues and pen neural invasion. It is an incredibly rare disease often found in the lungs of patients with a weakened immune system and can often lead to a fatal outcome. It occurs in patients with hematological malignancies and diabetes mellitus as well as leukemia. R. pusillis can cause infections in non-human animals as well. In animals the fungus is found in the kidneys and can lead to mucormycotic abortion..

References

http://www.mycology.adelaide.edu.au/Fungal_Descriptions/Zygomycetes/Rhizomucor/Eucker, J., O. Sezer, B. Graf, and K. Possinger. 2001. Mucormycoses.Mycoses. 44:253-260.Ribes, J. A., C. L. Vanover-Sams, and D. J. Baker. 2000. Zygomycetes in human disease. Clin Microbiol Rev. 13:236-301.Bjorkholm, M., G. Runarsson, F. Celsing, M. Kalin, B. Petrini, and P. Engervall. 2001. Liposomal amphotericin B and surgery in the successful treatment of invasive pulmonary mucormycosis in a patient with acute T- lymphoblastic leukemia. Scand J Infec Dis. 33:316-319.J. Clin. Microbiol. November 2004 vol. 42 no. 11 5400–5402; Pathogenic Fungi in Humans and Animals; edited by D.H. Howard

Fungi